Osvaldo David Martínez Arce (born 8 April 1986) is a Paraguayan professional footballer who plays as a midfielder. He is a naturalized Mexican citizen.

Career

Club Libertad
Osvaldo Martínez began his career with Club Libertad in 2003, playing in over 150 matches and winning four league titles before transferring to Mexican club Monterrey.

Monterrey C.F.
Osvaldo made the move to Monterrey in 2008 for a fee of about £2 million. He made an immediate impact with his new club, scoring in the first minute of his first match in the league, a 4–0 victory over Puebla. While at Monterrey, Martínez would play in over 100 matches, winning two league titles, an Interliga in 2010, and a CONCACAF Champions League trophy in 2011.

Atlante
Osvaldo transferred again, this time to Atlante in July 2011. He made his league debut for the club on 30 July 2011 in a 3–0 loss to Santos Laguna, coming on for Diego Ordaz in the 59th minute. He scored his first league goal for the club on 27 August 2011 in a 2–1 win against Tecos F.C. The goal, scored in the 52nd minute, came from the penalty spot. His first season with Atlante was the most prolific of his career, scoring 12 goals over 33 league matches.

Club America
In January 2013, it was announced that Martínez was sold to Club América. In his first tournament América won the league title, defeating Cruz Azul on penalties, with Martínez scoring the third goal for América. He would win another league title the following year, as well as another CONCACAF Champions League in 2015.

Santos Laguna
In January 2017, Martinez was included in part of a swap deal between America and Santos Laguna. He made his league debut for Santos Laguna on 7 January 2017 in a 0–0 draw with Tigres UANL, coming on for Djaniny in the 71st minute. His first league goal for the club came on 26 February 2017 in a 2–2 draw with Necaxa. The goal, assisted by Djaniny, came in the 26th minute and was the first of the game.

International career
Martínez has been capped 32 times for the Paraguay national team, scoring one goal. He made his debut on 15 October 2008, in a FIFA World Cup 2010 qualifying match in Asunción against Peru. In 2015 Martínez announced his retirement from the national team, yet he came out of international retirement and played with Paraguay in the 2018 World Cup Qualifiers in March 2016.

Personal life
Osvaldo is currently married to Giselle Martínez, with whom he has one child.

Career statistics

International goals

|-
| 1. || 12 October 2010 || Westpac Stadium, Wellington, New Zealand ||  || 0–2 || 0–2 || Friendly
|}

Honours
Libertad
 Primera División: Apertura 2006, Clausura 2007, Apertura 2008, Clausura 2008

Monterrey
 Primera División: Apertura 2009, Apertura 2010
 CONCACAF Champions League: 2010–11
 InterLiga: 2010

América
 Liga MX: Clausura 2013, Apertura 2014
 CONCACAF Champions League: 2014–15, 2015–16

Santos Laguna
 Liga MX: Clausura 2018

References

External links
 
 
 
 

1986 births
Living people
Sportspeople from Luque
Paraguayan footballers
Paraguay international footballers
Paraguayan expatriate footballers
Association football midfielders
Club Libertad footballers
C.F. Monterrey players
Club América footballers
Atlante F.C. footballers
Santos Laguna footballers
Atlas F.C. footballers
Club Puebla players
Paraguayan Primera División players
Liga MX players
2011 Copa América players
2015 Copa América players
Naturalized citizens of Mexico
Expatriate footballers in Mexico
Paraguayan expatriate sportspeople in Mexico